EDSS can refer to:
Elmira District Secondary School, the high school serving the town of Elmira, Ontario, Canada and the surrounding area
Expanded Disability Status Scale, a medical scale to monitor the disability changes in multiple sclerosis